Cold Creek County is a Canadian country rock group based in Brighton, Ontario. Its members are Doug Oliver, Josh Lester, Trevor MacLeod, Justin Lester, and Jordan Honsinger. They were founded in 2013 and signed to Sony Music Canada in 2014.

History

They toured with Dallas Smith, Emerson Drive, Kira Isabella and Jason Blaine. They released their debut single, "Our Town", in April 2015. It was the most added debut single by a Canadian country artist. It has reached the top 10 on the Billboard Canada Country chart. It was written by Todd Clark and Gavin Slate.

The band performed in 2016 at the Tweed Stampede and Jamboree. That year the band was presented with a Canadian Radio Music Award.

In June, 2019 Cold Creek Country performed at the Country Music Association of Ontario awards gala. On September 24, 2019, Josh Lester and his brother Justin left the band.

Discography

Albums

Extended plays

Singles

Music videos

Awards and nominations

References

External links
.

Canadian country rock groups
Musical groups established in 2013
2013 establishments in Ontario